The phrase "unto the ages of ages" expresses either the idea of eternity, or an indeterminate number of aeons. The phrase is a translation of the original Koine Greek phrase "" (eis toùs aionas ton aiṓnōn), which occurs in the original Greek texts of the Christian New Testament (e.g. in Philippians 4:20). In the Latin Vulgate, the same phrase is translated as in saecula saeculorum.

Meaning and translations
The phrase possibly expresses the eternal duration of God's attributes, but it could also be an idiomatic way to represent a very long passage of time. Other variations of the phrase are found at e.g. Eph 3:21, as εἰς πάσας τὰς γενεὰς τοῦ αἰῶνος τῶν αἰώνων, ἀμήν, here referring to the glory of God the Father; this may be translated as "from all generations for ever and ever, amen", "for ages unto ages", or similar phrases.

The translation of aiōnes can be temporal, in which case it would correspond to the English "ages". Then again, it can be spatial, translated as "world" or "universe", and then one would need to translate in spatial terms, describing the cosmos so as to include both the heavenly and earthly world.

According to scholar David Bentley Hart: "Much depends, naturally, on how content one is to see the Greek adjective , aionios, rendered simply and flatly as "eternal" or "everlasting." It is, after all, a word whose ambiguity has been noted since the earliest centuries of the church. Certainly the noun αἰών, aion (or aeon), from which it is derived, did come during the classical and late antique periods to refer on occasion to a period of endless or at least indeterminate duration; but that was never its most literal acceptation. Throughout the whole of ancient and late antique Greek literature, an "aeon" was most properly an "age," which is simply to say a "substantial period of time" or an "extended interval." At first, it was typically used to indicate the lifespan of a single person, though sometimes it could be used of a considerably shorter period (even, as it happens, a single year). It came over time to mean something like a discrete epoch, or a time far in the past, or an age far off in the future", and also "John Chrysostom, in his commentary on Ephesians, even used the word aiōnios of the kingdom of the devil specifically to indicate that it is temporary (for it will last only till the end of the present age, he explains)".

New Testament
In the New Testament, the phrase occurs twelve times in the Book of Revelation alone, and another seven times in epistles, but not in the Gospels:
Galatians 1:5:  "... δόξα εἰς τοὺς αἰῶνας τῶν αἰώνων, ἀμήν."
Philippians 4:20: ""
1 Timothy 1:17: ""
2 Timothy 4:18: ""
Hebrews 13:21:   ""
1 Peter 4:11: ""
Revelation 1:6: ""
5:13: "" 
7:12, 10:6, 11:15, 15:7, 19:3, 20:10, 22:5: ""

Hebrew Bible
Some verses in the Hebrew Bible are similar to the "ages of ages" formula: For example, verses such as "" (Psalm 90:2), or "" (Jeremiah 25:5), or "" (Nehemiah 9:5). All these slightly different variations mean more or less the same: "(and) from (the) age to (the) age". In translations such as Young's Literal Translation, it is usually rendered as a finite duration, e.g. Nehemiah 9:5 "from the age unto the age,".

Christian liturgical use
When it is followed by an Amen, the last two words (saeculorum, Amen) may be abbreviated Euouae in medieval musical notation. Vernacular liturgical traditions often don't translate the Greek and Latin formula literally: The English translations of Christian prayers issued in 1541 by King Henry VIII 1541 and the later Book of Common Prayer replace it by "world without end"; the German Lutheran tradition reads "von Ewigkeit zu Ewigkeit", "from eternity to eternity", which is probably based on Old Testament formulas such as Psalm 90:2, Jeremiah 25:5, and Nehemiah 9:5, quoted in Hebrew above.

See also
Christian eschatology
Ten thousand years

References

Further reading
Strong's Greek Concordance (s.v. ")
German Bible Society Greek New Testament (GNT5) https://www.academic-bible.com/en/online-bibles/greek-new-testament-ubs5/read-the-bible-text/
Divine Liturgy of St. John Chrysostom (http://www.goarch.org/chapel/liturgical_texts/liturgy_hchc) Uses the English phrase "to the ages of ages" to translate the Greek phrase "" throughout this next Reference:
 (http://www.goarch.org/chapel/liturgical_texts/liturgy_hchc-el?set_language=el) Contains the Greek phrase "" 22 times.

New Testament Latin words and phrases
Christian eschatology